Dewas is a city in the Malwa region of the Indian state of Madhya Pradesh. The municipality was formerly the seat of two 15-Gun Salute state princely states during the British Raj, Dewas Junior state and Dewas Senior state, ruled by the Puar clan of the Marathas.  The city is the administrative capital of Dewas district. Dewas is an industrialised city and houses a government bank note press

Etymology

The name Dewas is derived from the Devi Vaishini hill in the city, commonly known as Tekri. The hill has a temple of the deities Devi Tulja Bhawani, Chamunda Mata and Kalika Mata. The word Dewas is believed to be a sandhi of the words Dev (deity) and Vas (abode in Marathi), so Dewas means house of the god. Swami Shivom Tirtha wrote the history of the hill (Tekri ) of Dewas in his book, Sadhan Shikhar. Inspired by the area, E.M. Forster wrote The Hill of Devi in 1953.

The district takes its name from its headquarters town, Dewas, which is said to be derived from the legend that Dewas rests at the foot of a 300-foot (91 m) conical hill known as Chamunda hill on whose summit is the shrine of Goddess Chamunda. The image of the goddess is cut into the wall of a cave, known as Devi Vashini or the goddess's residence. From this, the name Dewas (dev-vas) seems to have been derived.

History 

Dewas was formerly the capital of two princely states of British India. The original state was founded in the first half of the 18th century by the brothers Tukaji Rao (Senior) and Jivaji Rao (Junior), from the Puar clan of the Marathas. They had advanced into Malwa with the Maratha Peshwa, Baji Rao, in 1728. The brothers divided the territory among themselves; their descendants ruled as the senior and junior branches of the family. After 1841, each branch ruled its own portion as a separate state, though the lands belonging to each were intimately entangled; in Dewas, the capital town, the two sides of the main street were under different administrations and had different arrangements water supply and lighting.

Both Dewas states were in the Malwa Agency of the Central India Agency.

Dewas Junior & Dewas Senior Darbars (Courts) was composed of Sardars, Mankaris, Istamuradars, Thakurs and Jagirdars.

After India's independence in 1947, the Maharajas of Dewas (Jr. & Sr.) acceded to India, and their states were integrated into Madhya Bharat, which became a state of India in 1950. Later, in 1956, Madhya Bharat was merged into Madhya Pradesh state.

Geography
Dewas lies northeast of Indore, southeast of Ujjain, and southwest of Shajapur. The city is located on the level plains of the Malwa plateau; to the south, the land rises gently to the Vindhya Range, which is the source of the Chambal and Kali Sindh rivers that flow north through the district on their way to the Ganges. The main river in Dewas is Kshipra.

Demographics

The effective literacy rate of 7+ population of Dewas was 84.6%, of which male literacy rate was 91.1% and female literacy rate was 77.7%. Dewas had  households in 2011.

Administration

The Member of Parliament from Dewas is Mahendra Singh Solanki of BJP who was elected in the Lok Sabha Election 2019.
As of the 2018 Madhya Pradesh Legislative Assembly election, the member of the Legislative Assembly for Dewas is Gayatri Raje Pawar.

Industry 
Dewas was known for being a production centre of retail opium in the 1800s, as noted in the 1895 first report of the Royal Commission on Opium. Rapid industrialisation took place in the late 1970s and early 1980s, but due to inadequate infrastructure, the pace has slowed since the late 1980s. In recent years, some industries have closed their operations due to a shortage of sufficient infrastructure to support growth; there is a shortage of water due to excessive usage in previous decades.

The city has many industrial units providing employment to thousands of workers. The largest companies include Tata, Kirloskar and John Deere. Dewas is known as the Soy Capital of India and is a major part of the soy bean processing industry in the country.

Due to its location above sea level at one corner of the Malwa plateau, constant wind flows in the region are suitable for harvesting wind energy. There are more than 100 wind mills on a series of hills  from Dewas, generating around 15 megawatts of power. These were financed by a few private companies which sought a reliable power supply.

Media
In terms of print media, Satyakaar a daily evening newspaper is published from Dewas. Along with this, newspapers like Dainik Bhaskar, Naidunia, Patrika etc. published from Indore are also circulated here.

Transportation

Rail
Dewas Junction (station code: DWX) is the main railway junction of Dewas city. It is a 'B' Grade Railway Junction, under the Ratlam division of the Western Railways zone. It is well connected to nearby junctions such as Indore Junction (INDB) to the north-west and Ujjain Junction (UJN) south-west, via an electrified rail line. It is situated on Indore–Gwalior line rail line.

Road
Dewas is well connected to major cities across the state and country, via both National and State level highways. NH-47 and NH-52 connects Dewas to Indore and othe cities. MP SH-18 connects Dewas to Bhopal, Ujjain and Ahmedabad.

Air
Dewas does not have an airport or an airstrip of its own. An airport is proposed to be built in Dewas district at Chapda village. Construction of the airport is stated to begin soon.

Places of interest

 Dewas is known for the Devi Chamunda temple and the Devi Tulaja Bhavani temple situated on a  hilltop (Tekri). A broad flight of stone steps leads to two shrines to the goddesses, Choti Mata (Chamunda Mata) and Badi Mata (Tulja Bhavani Mata). Numerous other temples spread over the Tekri can be explored on foot.
 Shri Sheelnath Dhuni at the Tekri foothills is a place of worship for followers of Saint Sheelnath Maharaj's of Gorakh Nath Sumpradaya. Sheelnath Maharaj belonged to a royal family of Jaipur and later became a Yogi of Gorakh Nath Sumpradaya, who lived in Dewas in his old age.
 The Pawar Chatries near the Meetha talab of Dewas are examples of Maratha architecture in the area.
 Kailadevi temple at Dewas is the largest in the state. It is situated at Mishri Lal Nagar (Agra Bombay Road). It was established in December 1995 by businessman Mannulal Garg. This modern temple was built by South Indian artists; it houses a  statue of Lord Hanuman. The original Kaila Devi Temple is located on the banks of the Kalisil river in Karauli district of Rajasthan. The temple is devoted to the tutelary deity of the former princely rulers of the Karauli state, Kaila.
 Mahadev mandir is a temple in Shankar Gadh built by the Dewas ruler Shrimant Sadashive Rao Maharaja (Khase Saheb) in 1942. The temple is located on a small hill south of the city.
 Mahakaleshwar temple, Bilwali - Bilavali village is situated 3 km north of Dewas.

Notable people 

 
Tukoji Rao III Puar, (Ruler of Dewas Senior State)
Vikramsinh Rao I Puar, (Ruler of Dewas Senior State)
Krishnaji Rao III Puar, (Ruler of Dewas Senior State)
Tukoji Rao IV Puar, (Politician)
Gayatri Raje Puar, (Politician)
Vikram Singh Rao II Puar, (Politician)
Edward Morgan Forster, (English Author based in Dewas Senior State, who wrote 'Hill of Devi') 
Madhav Vinayak Kibe, (Statesman & Dewan of Dewas Junior State)
Kumar Gandharva, (Indian Classical Singer)
Digvijay Bhonsale, (Rock/Metal Musician)
Neha Hinge, (Model & Actress)
Anant Sadashiv Patwardhan, (Politician)
Mukul Shivputra, (Indian Classical Singer)
Kailash Chandra Joshi, (Politician)
Sajjan Singh Verma, (Politician)
Deepak Joshi, (Politician)
Manoj Choudhary, (Politician)
Tejsingh Sendhav, (Politician)
Manohar Untwal, (Politician)
Rajendrasingh Baghel, (Politician)
Hukam Chand Kachwai, (Politician)
Mahendra Solanki, (Politician)
Ashif Shaikh, (Social Worker)
Mishrilal Gangwal, (Politician)
Bapulal Kishan, (Politician)

See also 
 Maratha Empire
 List of Maratha dynasties and states

References

External links 

 Government website on Dewas district
 

 
Cities and towns in Dewas district
Cities in Malwa
Cities in Madhya Pradesh

de:Dewas